Chicoreus bourguignati is a species of sea snail, a marine gastropod mollusk in the family Muricidae, the murex snails or rock snails.

Description
The length of the shell varies between 6 and 10 centimeters.

Distribution
This marine species occurs from Southeast Africa to Sri Lanka and Yemen.

References

 oirier, J., 1883 Révision des Murex. Nouvelles Archives du Muséum d'Histoire naturelle 5: 13-128, sér. série 2
 Houart, R., 1992 The genus Chicoreus and related genera (Gastropoda: Muricidae) in the Indo-West Pacific. Mémoires du Muséum national d'Histoire naturelle 154(A): 1-188
 Steyn, D.G & Lussi, M. (2005). Offshore Shells of Southern Africa: A pictorial guide to more than 750 Gastropods. Published by the authors. Pp. i–vi, 1–289
 Houart R., Kilburn R.N. & Marais A.P. (2010) Muricidae. pp. 176–270, in: Marais A.P. & Seccombe A.D. (eds), Identification guide to the seashells of South Africa. Volume 1. Groenkloof: Centre for Molluscan Studies. 376 pp.

External links
 MNHN, Paris: lectotype

Muricidae
Gastropods described in 1883